Squinters is an Australian television comedy series which first screened on the ABC on Wednesday 7 February 2018.  All six episodes were also loaded on the ABC's iView catch up service on the same date. A second series went to air in 2019.

The first six-part series was produced by Jungle Entertainment and created by Trent O'Donnell and Adam Zwar. It is directed by O'Donnell along with Kate McCartney, Amanda Brotchie, Christiaan Van Vuuren and Cate Stewart. It was written by Zwar with Lally Katz, Sarah Scheller, Adele Vuko, Leon Ford and Ben Crisp.

Plot
Squinters follows commuters in peak hour transit as they drive to work. The title Squinters, refers to the fact that the commuters are facing the sun as they head east from Sydney's western suburbs in the mornings, and then also face into the sun in the afternoons on the way back to the western suburbs.

Cast
Sam Simmons as Lukas
 Tim Minchin as Paul (Series 1)
 Andrea Demetriades as Romi
 Mandy McElhinney as Bridget
 Jenna Owen as Mia
 Justin Rosniak as Macca
 Steen Raskopoulos as Ned (Series 1)
 Susie Youssef as Simoni
 Rose Matafeo as Talia
 Wayne Blair as Gary 
 Damon Herriman as Miles (Series 1)
 Jacki Weaver as Audrey (Series 1)
 Miranda Tapsell as Miranda	(Series 1)
 Nyasha Hatendi as Davis (Series 1)
 Christiaan Van Vuuren as Gavin
 John Luc as Vijay (Series 1)
 Adam Zwar as Traffic Reporter
 Genevieve Morris as Alison (Series 2)
 Justine Clarke as Jess (Series 2)
 Anne Edmonds as Amy (Series 2)
 Stephen Peacocke as Frank (Series 2)
 Kristen Schaal as Tina (Series 2)
 Claudia O'Doherty as Rachel (Series 2)

Episodes

Season 1 (2018)

Season 2 (2019)

Adaptation

In September 2020, Jungle Entertainment announced they are in active development on creating an adaptation of the series for U.S. audiences.

References

External links

Australian Broadcasting Corporation original programming
Australian comedy television series
2018 Australian television series debuts
2019 Australian television series endings
English-language television shows
Television shows set in Sydney